Chestertown Historic District may refer to:
Chesterton Commercial Historic District, Chesterton, IN, listed on the NRHP in Indiana
 Chestertown Historic District (Chestertown, Maryland), listed on the NRHP in Maryland
 Chestertown Historic District (Chestertown, New York), listed on the NRHP in New York